Awdheegle (also Awdhegele) is a town in the Lower Shabelle region in southern Somalia.

Demographics

Awdheegle is located west of Mogadishu on the Shebelle River. Awdheegle is predominantly inhabited by the Begedi clan sub-division of the wider Digil Rahanweyn family. They are one of the major Somali clans residing in the Horn of Africa who are native to South West.

References

Populated places in Lower Shebelle